Virgin Galactic Unity 23 is a planned sub-orbital spaceflight of the SpaceShipTwo-class VSS Unity which is intended to launch in 2023. It is a research mission for the Italian Air Force. The crew will consist of pilots Frederick Sturckow and Michael Masucci as well as crewmembers Beth Moses, Walter Villadei, Angelo Landolfi, and Pantaleone Carlucci. The flight was postponed from its original planned October 2021 flight date for Virgin Galactic to upgrade its SpaceShipTwo vehicles. 

During the flight, Villadei is expected to wear a suit to measure biometric data and his physiological responses to spaceflight. Landolfi will carry out experiments on the effects of microgravity on cognitive performance along with its effects on how materials mix. Carlucci's heart rate and other metrics will be monitored through sensors during the flight.

Crew

References

External links 

 N202VG Virgin Galactic 1 Flight tracking history log

2023 in spaceflight
SpaceShipTwo
Test spaceflights
Future human spaceflights
Aviation history of the United States
Suborbital human spaceflights
2023 in New Mexico
2023 in aviation